Gi Cheol or Ki Chul (died 1356), also known by his Mongolian name Bayan Buka, was a political figure and nobleman in the late Goryeo dynasty. After his younger sister, Empress Gi who was the wife of Toghon Temür gave birth to a prince, he then honoured as Internal Prince Deokseong.

Gi Cheol received a government post from the Yuan dynasty and appointed as Daesado (대사도, 大司徒) in 1340. Since the Haengju Gi clan was regarded as one of the noble family in Goryeo, so at Yuan official events, Gi Cheol was given preferential treatment with or equal to that of the Goryeo king. In 1356, he was invited to a palace banquet, but as soon as he entered it, King Gongmin, whom seen him and Gwon Gyeom for treason and conspiracy arrested them two and executed them by mace. Gi Yu-geol and Öljei Buka were also killed under King Gongmin's command. This event is known as Byeongsin coup in Korean history.

Family
Father: Gi Ja-o (기자오)
Grandfather: Gi-Gwan (기관)
Great-grandfather: Gi Yun-suk (기윤숙)
Great-great-grandfather: Gi Hong-yeong (기홍영)
Mother: Grand Lady Yeongan of the Yi clan (영안왕대부인 이씨), also known as Wangzai Han Khatun.
Grandfather: Yi Haeng-geom (이행검)
Older brother: Gi-Sik (기식)
Younger brother: Gi-Won, Prince Deokyang (기원 덕양군)
Nephew: Öljei Bukha
Younger brother: Gi-Ju (기주)
Younger brother: Gi-Yun (기윤)
Younger sister: Empress Gi – married Emperor Huizong of Yuan.
Nephew: Emperor Zhaozong of Yuan – married Empress Gwon.
Children(s):
1st son: Gi Yu-geol (기유걸; d. 1356)
2nd son: Gi In-geol (기인걸) – had a son (Gi-Sin (기신); father of Gi Seok-son (기석손)) and a daughter who married Bak-Gyeong (박경).
3rd son: Gi Se-geol (기세걸)
4th son: Saein Temür
5th son: Gi Sya-in (기샤인; d. 1356)
A daughter who married Wang Jung-gwi (왕중귀)

In popular culture
Portrayed by Kim Yoon-hyung in the 1983 KBS TV series Foundation of the Kingdom.
Portrayed by Lee Dae-yeon in the 2005–2006 MBC TV Series Shin Don.
Portrayed by Yu Oh-seong in the 2012 SBS TV series Faith.

References

Gi Cheol on Encykorea .
Gi Cheol on Doosan Encyclopedia .

Year of birth unknown
1356 deaths
Date of birth unknown
14th-century Korean people
Haengju Gi clan